MERP may refer to:

 Middle-earth Role Playing
 Medicaid Estate Recovery Program
 MerP, a member of the Mercury transporter